LISA Academy is an open-enrollment public charter high school in Little Rock, Arkansas, United States. Formed in 2004, LISA or Learn Innovate Support Achieve  serves more than 2200 students in grades K through 12. In 2008, LISA Academy opened a second campus known as LISA Academy North.

History
In 2019 the state allowed LISA to get control of an existing school in Springdale, Arkansas.

Academics 
As a public charter school, LISA Academy exceeds the requirements of the Smart Core curriculum developed the Arkansas Department of Education (ADE), which requires students to complete 22 credit units before graduation. Students engage in regular and Advanced Placement (AP) coursework and exams, preparatory courses in ACT/SAT testing, leadership workshops, and partnerships with local colleges and universities.

LISA Academy has partnered with the University of Central Arkansas, the University of Arkansas at Little Rock and the University of Arkansas at Monticello to offer twelve concurrent credit courses in math, English, history and music.

The National Center for Educational Achievement (NCEA), a department of ACT, Inc., recognized LISA Academy High School as a 2012 NCEA Higher Performing School. LISA Academy High received Higher Performing (HP) recognition in area of Literacy.

Extracurricular activities 
The LISA Academy Charter School mascot for academic and athletic teams is the Jaguar with school colors of red and Slightly darker Red.

Solar Car Engineering 
LISA Academy North has participated in the Solar Car Challenge competition in Texas Motor Speedway, Fort Worth, Texas since 2017. High School students have designed, built and completed their solar car.  They have competed in the Classic and Advanced Classis Divisions. In 2021, the team was awarded 1st place in 2- and 3-D mechanical drawing of the car. LISA North has the only solar car team in the state of Arkansas.

Athletics 
The LISA Academy Jaguars participate in various interscholastic activities in the 1A 5 North Conference administered by the Arkansas Activities Association. The Jaguars compete in volleyball, golf (boys/girls), basketball (boys/girls), tennis (boys/girls), soccer (boys/girls), Fencing (starting in 2014-2015 school year), and softball (starting in 2014-2015 school year).

See also 

 LISA Academy North

References

External links 
 

2004 establishments in Arkansas
Charter schools in Arkansas
Educational institutions established in 2004
High schools in Little Rock, Arkansas
Public high schools in Arkansas
Public middle schools in Arkansas
Schools in Pulaski County, Arkansas